Alaska Wing of Civil Air Patrol (CAP) is the highest echelon of Civil Air Patrol in the state of Alaska. Alaska Wing headquarters are located in Elmendorf Air Force Base. Alaska Wing consists of over 700 cadet and adult members at 16 locations across the state of Alaska.

Mission
Civil Air Patrol has three primary missions: providing emergency services; providing cadet programs for youth; and providing aerospace education.

Emergency services
Civil Air Patrol provides emergency services, including: search and rescue missions; disaster relief, including providing air and ground transportation of emergency supplies and disaster relief officials to disaster areas; humanitarian services, including the transport of blood and human tissue; Air Force support; and counter-drug operations.

Cadet programs
Cadets aged 12 to 21 may participate in a 16-step cadet program which includes aerospace education, leadership training, physical fitness and moral leadership.

Aerospace education
CAP provides education for both CAP members and the general public; internal training is provided to cadets and senior members through the CAP program, while education is provided to the general public through workshops conducted through the education system.

Organization
Alaska Wing is divided into sixteen squadrons, which report to the headquarters located at Elmendorf Air Force Base.

See also
Alaska Air National Guard
Alaska Naval Militia
Alaska State Defense Force

References

External links
Alaska Wing Civil Air Patrol official website

Wings of the Civil Air Patrol
Education in Alaska
Military in Alaska